Capracotta is a comune (municipality) in the Province of Isernia in the Italian region of Molise, located about  northwest of Campobasso and about  north of Isernia.

Capracotta borders the municipalities of Agnone, Castel del Giudice, Pescopennataro, San Pietro Avellana, Sant'Angelo del Pesco, and Vastogirardi.

Main sights
 Giardino di Flora Appenninica

Notable people
 

Giovanni Carnevale (1924–2021), Italian priest, writer and historian

References

Cities and towns in Molise